Firehouse USA: Boston was a 2005 TV series on Discovery Channel. The series followed Boston Fire Department Engine Company 37 and Ladder Company 26, quartered on Huntington Ave., Boston, Massachusetts. The narrator was Mikey Kelley and the executive producer was Mark Kadin. The series premiered September 20, 2005 and was canceled later that year. A likely reason Huntington Ave was chosen was due to it being regarded as one of the busiest firehouses in Boston.

Post-series
One of the firefighters who appeared in the series, Lt. Kevin Kelly, was killed in a crash when Ladder 26 was returning from a call. The ladder truck became a runaway due to brake failure on a hill, the truck hit two parked cars then a building killing Lt. Kelly & injured 3 other fire fighters. (Also see: BFD Apparatus)

See also
Boston Fire Department, where the series was filmed
Emergency!, a 1970s drama about two paramedics and their firehouse
Rescue 911, a 1990s true series of saving lives
Third Watch, a 2000s drama about the FDNY and NYPD
Rescue Me, a 2000s drama about the FDNY

References

Television series about firefighting
2000s American reality television series
2005 American television series debuts
2005 American television series endings
Discovery Channel original programming
Television shows filmed in Boston